Burnt Fingers is a 1927 American mystery film directed by Maurice S. Campbell and starring Eileen Percy, Ivan Doline and Edna Murphy.

A young woman working as a dancer at a nightclub goes to confront a man who is blackmailing her friend with incriminating letters. When he is killed, she comes under suspicion of murder. However it turns out that he was a foreign spy, and she had nothing to do with his slaying.

Cast
 Eileen Percy as Anne Cabell 
 Ivan Doline as Stockmar 
 Edna Murphy as Vera 
 Wilfred Lucas as Lord Cumberly 
 George O'Hara as Dick 
 Jane Jennings as Mrs. Cabell 
 J. Moy Bennett as Mr. Cabell

References

Bibliography
 Ken Wlaschin. Silent Mystery and Detective Movies: A Comprehensive Filmography. McFarland, 2009.

External links
 

1927 films
1927 mystery films
American silent feature films
American mystery films
American black-and-white films
Films directed by Maurice Campbell
Pathé Exchange films
Films set in London
1920s English-language films
1920s American films
Silent mystery films